Leander Jordan (born September 15, 1977) is a former American football offensive tackle. He was drafted by the Carolina Panthers in the third round of the 2000 NFL Draft. He played college football at Indiana University of Pennsylvania (IUP).

References

External links
 Jacksonville Jaguars profile

1977 births
Living people
American football offensive guards
American football offensive tackles
Atlanta Falcons players
Carolina Panthers players
IUP Crimson Hawks football players
Jacksonville Jaguars players
San Diego Chargers players
Players of American football from Pittsburgh